Cyperus alterniflorus, commonly known as umbrella flat-sedge, is a sedge of the family Cyperaceae that is native to Australia.

The plant blooms between June and October producing yellow-green-brown flowers. Following flowering it will form a trigonous pale red-brown to dark brown nut.

In Western Australia it is found around creeks and swamps in the Mid West, Wheatbelt and Goldfields-Esperance regions where it grows in sandy-clay soils. It is also found in inland areas of New South Wales, Queensland and South Australia.

See also
List of Cyperus species

References

Plants described in 1810
Flora of Western Australia
Flora of South Australia
Flora of New South Wales
Flora of Queensland
alterniflorus
Taxa named by Robert Brown (botanist, born 1773)